The 2003 Subway 500 was the 32nd stock car race of the 2003 NASCAR Winston Cup Series season and the 55th iteration of the event. The race was held on Sunday, October 19, 2003, before a crowd of 88,000 in Martinsville, Virginia at Martinsville Speedway, a  permanent oval-shaped short track. The race took the scheduled 500 laps to complete. At race's end, Jeff Gordon, driving for Hendrick Motorsports, would dominate most of the race weekend to win his 63rd career NASCAR Winston Cup Series victory and his second of the season. To fill out the podium, Jimmie Johnson, driving for Hendrick Motorsports, and Tony Stewart, driving for Joe Gibbs Racing, would finish second and third, respectively.

Background 

Martinsville Speedway is an NASCAR-owned stock car racing track located in Henry County, in Ridgeway, Virginia, just to the south of Martinsville. At 0.526 miles (0.847 km) in length, it is the shortest track in the NASCAR Cup Series. The track was also one of the first paved oval tracks in NASCAR, being built in 1947 by H. Clay Earles. It is also the only remaining race track that has been on the NASCAR circuit from its beginning in 1948.

Entry list 

 (R) denotes rookie driver.

Practice

First practice 
The first practice session was held on Friday, October 17, at 11:20 AM EST. The session would last for two hours.

In the session, Ultra Motorsports driver Jimmy Spencer would suffer a crash, forcing Spencer to go to a backup car and start at the rear of the field for the race.

Second practice 
The second practice session was held on Saturday, October 18, at 9:30 AM EST. The session would last for 45 minutes.

Third and final practice 
The final practice session, sometimes referred to as Happy Hour, was held on Saturday, October 18, at 9:30 AM EST. The session would last for 45 minutes.

In the session, BelCar Motorsports driver Todd Bodine would wreck in Turn 1, forcing Bodine to go to a backup car and start at the rear of the field for the race.

Qualifying 
Qualifying was held on Friday, October 17, at 3:05 PM EST. Each driver would have two laps to set a fastest time; the fastest of the two would count as their official qualifying lap. Positions 1-36 would be decided on time, while positions 37-43 would be based on provisionals. Six spots are awarded by the use of provisionals based on owner's points. The seventh is awarded to a past champion who has not otherwise qualified for the race. If no past champ needs the provisional, the next team in the owner points will be awarded a provisional.

Two drivers would fail to qualify: Mark Green and Morgan Shepherd. In addition, three drivers would fail to make a lap: the Robert Yates Racing cars of Elliott Sadler and Dale Jarrett, and the aforementioned Morgan Shepherd. Dale Jarrett would suffer a crash on his first qualifying lap, and Sadler would suffer left rear camber problems that would prevent him from setting a lap, forcing both to take a provisional. Meanwhile, Shepherd's car was declared too light according to NASCAR, and could not get the car out on time to qualify.

Full qualifying results

Race results

References 

2003 NASCAR Winston Cup Series
NASCAR races at Martinsville Speedway
October 2003 sports events in the United States
2003 in sports in Virginia